Mikośka is a river of Poland, a tributary of the Wisłok in Rzeszów.

Rivers of Poland
Rivers of Podkarpackie Voivodeship